Standard atmosphere may refer to:

 A standard reference value for air pressure:
 Atmosphere (unit), an approximation of the value at sea level
 Atmospheric pressure, other reference values
 One of various static atmospheric models of how atmospheric pressure, density, and temperature vary with altitude, such as:
 The U.S. Standard Atmosphere, a series of models that give values for pressure, density, and temperature over a range of altitudes
 The International Standard Atmosphere (ISA), an international standard model, defining typical atmospheric properties with altitude, at mid-latitude

See also
NRLMSISE-00
Standard conditions for temperature and pressure